Alamdanga is an upazila of Chuadanga District in the Division of Khulna, Bangladesh.

Geography
It has 44,699 households and total area 360.4 km2.

Demographics
According to 2011 Bangladesh census, Alamdanga had a population of 345,922. Males constituted 49.99% of the population and females 50.01. Muslims formed 90.33% of the population, Hindus 2.61% Christians 7.93%, and others 0.045%. Alamdanga had a literacy rate of 45.67% for the population 7 years and above.

As of the 1991 Bangladesh census, Alamdanga has a population of 245,524. Males constitute 51.66% of the population, and females 48.34%. This upazila's population of individuals 18 and over is 127,055. Alamdanga has an average literacy rate of 23.2% (7+ years), and the national average of 32.4% literate.

As of the 2001 census, the population of the upazila was 308,917; male 158,951, female 149,966; Muslim 299,001, Hindu 2,919, Christian 14,3251 and others 109.

Arts and culture
Main source sources of income:  Agriculture 41.76%, non-agriculture labourer 27.35%, industry 0.84%, business 12.54%, service 3.78%, construction 0.87%, religious service  0.17%, rent and remittance 0.43%, transport and communication 2.89% and others 6.01%.

Administration
Alamdanga Upazila is divided into Alamdanga Municipality and 15 union parishads: Ailhans, Belgachi, Baradi, Bhangabaria, Chitla, Dauki, Gangni, Hardi, Jamjami, Jehala, Kalidashpur, Khadimpur, Kashkorara, Kumari, and Nagdah. The union parishads are subdivided into 126 mauzas and 211 villages.

Alamdanga Municipality is subdivided into 9 wards and 18 mahallas.

Education

A number of educational institutions are in Alamdanga.
 Gokulkhali High School (1947)
 Katavanga Secondary School
 Gholdari Bazar Secondary School
 Gholdari Bazar Secondary Girls School
 Ailhash Laxmipur High School (1940)
 Kayetpara High School (established in 1965)
 Khashkarara Secondary School
 Alamdanga Alim Madrasa
 Nowlamary Alim Madrasa (established in 2000)
 Khashkarara Degree College
 Alamdanga Govt.Degree College
 Nigar Siddik College
 Alamdanga Mohila Degree College
 Dr.Afser Uddin College
 M. S. Zoha Degree College
 Hatboalia Higher Secondary School
 Nippon Zoha Technical School (Voc)
 Mir Samsul Alam Islam Polytechnic Institute
 M. S. Zoha Krishi College
 Osmanpur Pragpur High School
 Hardi High School
 Hatboalia High School
 Alamdanga Govt. Model Pilot High School (established in 1914)
Kumari union secondary school
 Alamdanga Girls School
 Alamdaga Pre-Cadet School
 Madrasatut Taqwa (Alamdanga Madrasa) 
 Sebabag High School
 Paikpara Jana Kalyan Secondary School-1962
 Munsganj Academy High School
 Munshiganj Girls School (Building Doneted By Late phani bhusan pal S/O late janakinath pal-former jamindar of the area)
 Ershadpur Academia
 Asmankhali High School (Establish 1967)
 Bademaju Badal Smrity Academy
 Bara Gangni High School
 Bashira Malik Dawki High School
 Batapara Shialmari High School
 Belgachi High School
 Bhangbaria High School
 Bhodua Secondary School
 Bhogail Bagdi High School
 C H R High School
 Enayetpur Baradi Alhajj Mir Khoster Ali Secondary School
 Poltadanga High School
 Kabilnagar Alim Madrasha
 Science Plus Academic Care
Bright Model School
 Prime Polytechnic Institute
Al Iqra Academy

See also
 Nowlamary
Upazilas of Bangladesh
Districts of Bangladesh
Divisions of Bangladesh

References

Upazilas of Chuadanga District
Chuadanga District
Khulna Division